The APC-7 connector (also referred to as a 7 mm connector) is a precision coaxial connector used on laboratory microwave test equipment for frequencies up to 18 GHz. APC-7 connectors are advantageous because they have a low-reflection coefficient, make repeatable coaxial connections, and are genderless. The connectors are expensive, so they are seldom used outside the laboratory where their cost can be justified by their accuracy and convenience. Due to their high cost, their 18 GHz frequency limitation, and new laboratory practices, the connectors are now uncommon.  Modern low frequency microwave equipment often uses the less expensive 3.5 mm (26.5 GHz) connector.  Higher frequency equipment must use higher performance connectors such as the 2.92 mm (40 GHz), 2.4 mm (50 GHz), 1.85 mm (67 GHz), or 1.0 mm (110 GHz) connectors.

Features 
APC-7 connector pairs have several desirable features:
 The connectors are genderless. This avoids some awkward adapters or duplication of laboratory standards. With a gendered connector, a laboratory might need a precision male load and a precision female load. With a genderless connector, only one load is required. Although the illustration shows threads on one connector of the pair, the (male) threaded ring can be screwed back to leave a female screw thread.
 The connectors have a well-defined reference plane. Consequently, the connectors simplify some measurements.
 The mated pair of APC-7 connectors has a low reflection coefficient and thus low voltage standing wave ratio (VSWR). The low reflection coefficient means better measurement accuracy. The typical VSWR is 1.025:1 at 18 GHz.
 The mated pair makes a repeatable connection. A pair has a repeatable reflection coefficient to ±0.001. Consequently, laboratory measurements have reduced uncertainty.

Adapters
APC-7 connectors require adapters to change from the connectors used in the laboratory to those used on everyday products. These adapters are expensive precision devices. For example, an APC-7 to type N (f) cost $105 in 1979. Such adapters bought new today (as of July 2012) can cost as much as $294.

History
"APC" stands for Amphenol Precision Connector and "-7" for 7 millimetres. Hewlett-Packard started developing the connector in the mid-1960s. Amphenol improved the design and manufactured the connector.

Notes

References

External links

http://www.rosenberger.de/ok/images/documents/spez/07.pdf [inactive - 4 Feb 2019] Rosenberger RPC-7 document that shows interface dimensions; RPC is Rosenberger's designation for its APC-7 connector
https://web.archive.org/web/20170707175918/http://www.rosenberger.de/ok/images/documents/spez/07.pdf [active - 4 Feb 2019]
https://www.rosenberger.com/0_documents/de/specs/tm/07.pdf [active - 4 Feb 2019] 

RF connectors